Bun-Rye's Story is a 1971 South Korean film directed by Yu Hyun-mok. It was based on a novel by Bang Young-wung.

Plot
Bun-rye, the eldest daughter in a poor family, is violated by Yong-pal, who is a married man, and out of desperation she becomes a concubine of Young-cheol, a gambler who is impotent. Kong Jo-shi is in love with Bun-rye, though she still has feelings for Yong-pal. After losing his money, Young-cheol takes out his anger on Bun-rye and throws her out of his house. In retaliation, Jo-shi kills Young-cheol, and Bun-rye is driven to madness.

Cast
 Yoon Jeong-hee
 Lee Soon-jae
 Heo Jang-kang
 Choi Nam-Hyun
 Ju Jeung-ryu
 Sa Mi-ja
 Ahn In-sook

Release
Bun-Rye's Story was rated 18 and opened in South Korea on 6 May 1971 at Kukdo Theater. The film received a total of 96,281 admissions.

Awards
Bun-Rye's Story won a number of awards at the 10th Grand Bell Awards in 1971, including Best Director for Yu Hyun-mok, Best Actress for Yoon Hung-hee, Best Supporting Actress for Sa Mi-ja, and Best Music for Kim Hee-jo.

Grand Bell Awards
 Best Director: Yu Hyun-mok
 Best Actress: Yoon Jeong-hee
 Best Supporting Actress: Sa Mi-ja
 Best Musical Score: Kim Hee-jo
 Best Sound Recording: Lee Kyung-Soon

PaekSang Arts Awards
 Award for Film Category: Heo Jang-kang

Recovery
Although once thought to be lost, a print of Bun-Rye's Story was recovered from overseas and restored by the Korean Film Council, who screened the film at their theater in northern Seoul on 18 May 2009.

See also
 List of rediscovered films

References

External links
 
 
 
 

1971 films
Films based on Korean novels
1970s Korean-language films
Films directed by Yu Hyun-mok
1970s rediscovered films
South Korean drama films
1971 drama films
Rediscovered South Korean films
Films set in South Chungcheong Province
Films shot in South Chungcheong Province